The Selangor–Singapore rivalry was a football rivalry that occurred between 1921 until 1994. It is the oldest football derby in Malaysian football.

The clubs were the most successful teams in Malaysia, having won 71 major honours between them, 28 for Singapore and 43 for Selangor. Most of the honours they won came from the Malaysia Cup. Both were also the most supported teams in Malaysian football. Every match between these two teams attracted high interest from fans due to its intensity.

Samad Allapitchay, the Singapore FA captain during the 1977 Malaysia Cup final noted to have said "The football rivalry between Singapore and Selangor has always been a special one. On the pitch, we hated each other".

History

The first encounter of the teams, officially is on 1 October 1921 during 1921 Malaya Cup final where Singapore defeated Selangor with scoreline 2-1. Unofficially, there is a record of friendlies named 'Classics' from 1901 till 1913 between these two teams, with Singapore winning its first edition. During the pre-war years, Singapore and Selangor FA were a dominant force and fierce rivals, winning the Cup 19 times between them. The post war years were also dominated by Singapore and Selangor up till 1970, where Selangor emerged as the dominant force in the Malaysia Cup with eleven Cup wins, compared to two victories by Singapore.

The rivalries ended when Singapore pulled out from Malaysian League in 1994 due to dispute with Football Association of Malaysia (FAM) about ticketing issue. From 2011 till 2015, a new Singapore representative, the LIONSXII join the Malaysian League. However, the squad were the country under 23 team and bound to several specialty (will not have to face relegation and unable to recruit foreign players).

List of Matches

From 1921 to 1994

Statistics
From 1921 to 1994

*include 1930 Malaya Cup abandoned match

Last updated: 20 July 2015

Honors
Honours from 1921 till 1994

See also 
Sultan of Selangor Cup
East Coast Derby
Klang Valley Derby
 List of association football rivalries
 List of sports rivalries

References

1986-1994 Records

Malaysia football derbies
Selangor FA
Singapore FA